The 2020–21 AHL season was the 85th season of the American Hockey League. Due to the ongoing restrictions in the COVID-19 pandemic, the start of the regular season was pushed back to February 5, 2021, and the league championship Calder Cup was not awarded for the second consecutive season. The Hershey Bears won the Macgregor Kilpatrick Trophy for the best regular-season record, their eighth regular-season championship. This was the first season under Scott Howson as the league's president after David Andrews announced his retirement after 26 years in the position.

League changes
After the previous season was curtailed due to the COVID-19 pandemic, there was no certainty for the AHL's 2020–21 season due to continuing limitations on arena capacities and traveling during the pandemic. The league had originally hoped to start play by December 4, 2020, but was later pushed back to at least February 5, 2021. Similar to the National Hockey League, the league was reportedly exploring the option of playing with an all-Canada division due to increased border travel restrictions between the United States and Canada.

On January 4, 2021, the league announced its plans and divisional alignment for the shortened season. The four Canadian teams were placed in their own division with a season start date still pending provincial approval. Three teams opted out of the season entirely: the Charlotte Checkers, Milwaukee Admirals, and the Springfield Thunderbirds. Seven teams temporarily relocated to be closer to their parent teams or due to venue availability during the pandemic: the Belleville Senators to Ottawa; the Binghamton Devils to Newark, New Jersey; the Laval Rocket to Montreal; the Ontario Reign to El Segundo, California; the Providence Bruins to Marlborough, Massachusetts; the San Diego Gulls to Irvine, California; and the Stockton Heat to Calgary. The San Jose Barracuda also opened their season with home games in Tucson before returning to San Jose.

The schedule for the American divisions was released on January 22; however, the Canadian teams had not yet received provincial clearance. Stockton then moved from the Pacific to the Canadian Division on January 28 causing scheduling changes to the Pacific Division. On February 1, the league announced a revised schedule and that the start of the season for the Canadian Division had been postponed. The beginning of the Canadian schedule was released on February 9 with a February 12 start date, but the two Ontario teams still did not have approval to play at home.

The league allowed each division the choice to hold a divisional postseason. On April 29, it was announced that only the Pacific Division had elected to hold a postseason tournament to name a division champion, with the other four divisions awarding their champions via regular season records. Consequently, the league would not award the Calder Cup for a second consecutive season.

Team and NHL affiliation changes

Relocations
The San Antonio Rampage franchise was purchased by the National Hockey League's Vegas Golden Knights and relocated to the Las Vegas area. The team became the Henderson Silver Knights playing out of Orleans Arena in Paradise, Nevada, with plans to move into a new venue in nearby Henderson, Nevada, upon completion.

Hiatus
Due to the COVID-19 pandemic, three teams chose to not participate in the season.
Charlotte Checkers
Milwaukee Admirals
Springfield Thunderbirds

Affiliation changes

Coaching changes

Final standings 
 indicates team clinched regular season division title

Final standings as of May 20, 2021

Statistical leaders

Leading skaters 
The following players are sorted by points, then goals. Final as of May 20, 2021.

GP = Games played; G = Goals; A = Assists; Pts = Points; +/– = Plus-minus; PIM = Penalty minutes

Leading goaltenders 
The following goaltenders with a minimum 660 minutes played lead the league in goals against average. Final as of May 20, 2021.

GP = Games played; TOI = Time on ice (in minutes); SA = Shots against; GA = Goals against; SO = Shutouts; GAA = Goals against average; SV% = Save percentage; W = Wins; L = Losses; OT = Overtime/shootout loss

Postseason

For the second consecutive season, there was no Calder Cup playoffs. The teams in the Pacific Division held a postseason tournament to name a division champion. All seven Pacific teams participated, with the bottom four teams participating in a single-elimination play-in series to face the top seed in the division semifinal. The semifinals and finals were both best-of-three series.

Pacific Division playoff
Final results:

AHL awards

All-star teams
Instead of the traditional first and second all-star teams, the league named an all-star team for each division in addition to the annual all-rookie team.

Atlantic Division
Jeremy Swayman (G) – Providence
Samuel Bolduc (D) – Bridgeport
Tarmo Reunanen (D) – Hartford
Morgan Barron (F) – Hartford
Cameron Hughes (F) – Providence
Jakub Lauko (F) – Providence

Canadian Division
Cayden Primeau (G) – Laval
Otto Leskinen (D) – Laval
Connor Mackey (D) – Stockton
Kalle Kossila (F) – Toronto
Egor Sokolov (F) – Belleville
Nathan Todd (F) – Manitoba

Central Division
Beck Warm (G) – Chicago
Calen Addison (D) – Iowa
Cody Franson (D) – Rockford
Riley Barber (F) – Grand Rapids
Riley Damiani (F) – Texas
Adam Mascherin (F) – Texas

North Division
Zane McIntyre (G) – Lehigh Valley
Oskari Laaksonen (D) – Rochester
Cameron Schilling (D) – Hershey
Boris Katchouk (F) – Syracuse
Connor McMichael (F) – Hershey
Taylor Raddysh (F) – Syracuse

Pacific Division
Logan Thompson (G) – Henderson
Josh Mahura (D) – San Diego
Ryan Murphy (D) – Henderson
Cooper Marody (F) – Bakersfield
Andrew Poturalski (F) – San Diego
T. J. Tynan (F) – Colorado

All-Rookie
Logan Thompson (G) – Henderson
Calen Addison (D) – Iowa
Max Gildon (D) – Bakersfield
Riley Damiani (F) – Texas
Connor McMichael (F) – Hershey
Phil Tomasino (F) – Chicago

See also
List of AHL seasons
2020 in ice hockey

References

External links
AHL official site

2020-21 season
American Hockey League seasons
2020–21 in American ice hockey by league
2020–21 in Canadian ice hockey by league